Fetting is a surname. Notable people with the surname include:
 Edmund Fetting (1927–2001), a Polish movie and theatrical actor
 Otto Fetting (1871–1933), an American realtor and editor
 Rainer Fetting (born 1949), a German painter and sculptor

See also 
 Fitting (disambiguation)